Skinner is an unincorporated community in Audrain County, in the U.S. state of Missouri.

History
A post office called Skinner was established in 1893, and remained in operation until 1900. The community bears the name of an early settler.

References

Unincorporated communities in Audrain County, Missouri
Unincorporated communities in Missouri